Khlong Hoi Khong is a district (amphoe) of Songkhla province, southern Thailand.

History
The minor district (king amphoe) was established on 1 April 1992 by splitting off the three tambons, Khlong Hoi Khong, Khok Muang, and Thung Lan, from Hat Yai district. It was upgraded to a full district on 11 October 1997.

Geography
Neighboring districts are (from the north clockwise): Hat Yai and Sadao of Songkhla Province and Khuan Kalong of Satun province.

Administration
The district is divided into four sub-districts (tambond), which are further subdivided into 32 villages (mubans). There are no municipal (thesaban) areas within the district; there are four tambon administrative organizations (TAO).

References

External links
amphoe.com

Districts of Songkhla province